Spice and Wolf is a Japanese manga series written by Isuna Hasekura and illustrated by Keito Koume, with collaboration from Jū Ayakura. Based on the light novel series of the same name, the series follows Kraft Lawrence, a traveling merchant, who meets and begins traveling with a pagan wolf-deity named Holo after he unintentionally frees her from the village she has been bound to for hundreds of years. As they make their way up north to Holo's birthplace, they engage in trade to obtain enough profit so that Lawrence may realize his dream of settling down and opening his own shop one day. At the same time, they must deal with the hazards of business and evade the attention of the Church.

The manga is serialized monthly in ASCII Media Works' seinen manga magazine Dengeki Maoh since November 2007. As of April 2011, the chapters have been collected in ten tankōbon volumes in Japan. Yen Press licensed the manga series at New York Comic Con 2009, and began releasing the series in English in North America starting in 2009. It has been published in Polish by Studio JG and in Chinese by Kadokawa Media in Taiwan and by Kadokawa Intercontinental in Hong Kong starting in August 2008.

Volume list

See also

List of Spice and Wolf light novels
List of Spice and Wolf episodes

References

External links 
 

Spice and Wolf